V. A. Dilshad (known in industry circles as Pippy) was an Indian cinematographer who worked in Hindi cinema, Malayalam, Kannada, Marathi and English-language films.

On 27 May 2021, Dilshad died in Mumbai after being hospitalised, over a month for COVID-19.

Career
Dilshad started his career as an assistant and associate cameraman to Ramachandra Babu for more than 40 films. Later he joined with Ravi Yadav as second operative cameraman for various Bollywood films directed by Abbas–Mustan like Race 2, Players, Race, Naqaab and Aitraaz.

His Hindi debut, The Waiting Room directed by Maneej Premnath, was reviewed as "master cinematography that captures the mood almost perfectly". He also completed the Marathi film Antar produced by actor Akshay Kumar and the English film The Black Russian, which won the Best Cinematography award at the 2014 Action on Film Festival.

Dilshad cranked the camera for Kapil Sharma's debut Kis Kisko Pyaar Karoon and Machine starring newcomer Mustafa Burmawalla and Kiara Advani, both films directed by Abbas–Mustan Dilshad has also completed two films; Escape from Black Water (English) and Fatwa (Marathi), that will have a theatrical release in 2022.

Filmography

Additional credits

Dilshad has worked in several films as an assistant, associate cameraman and later as 2nd Operative Cameraman.

References

External links

1966 births
2021 deaths
Hindi film cinematographers
Cinematographers from Kerala
Film people from Kerala
Indian cinematographers
Malayalam film cinematographers
Marathi film cinematographers
People from Ernakulam district
Deaths from the COVID-19 pandemic in India